Nérilia Mondésir (born 17 January 1999) is a Haitian footballer who plays as a forward for French Division 1 Féminine club Montpellier HSC and the Haiti women's national team. Nérilia is commonly known by her nickname Nérigol. Prior joining Montpellier HSC, Nérigol had played for the Haitian national team and youth sides, as well as for Tigresses FC in Haiti.

International goals
Scores and results list Haiti's goal tally first

Honours

Individual
CONCACAF Women's U-17 Championship Golden Boot: 2016

CONCACAF Women's U-17 Championship Best XI: 2016

References

External links
 

1999 births
Living people
Women's association football forwards
Haitian women's footballers
People from Nord (Haitian department)
Haiti women's international footballers
Competitors at the 2014 Central American and Caribbean Games
Montpellier HSC (women) players
Division 1 Féminine players
Haitian expatriate footballers
Haitian expatriate sportspeople in France
Expatriate women's footballers in France